Lopinga achine, the woodland brown, is a Palearctic butterfly in the family Nymphalidae.

Description in Seitz
P. achine Scop. (= dejanira L.) (45 g). Dark brown: forewing with 5—6 eye-rings forming a chain, hindwing with 2—4 such rings. Underside proximally to the ocelli with a white distal band which is variable and may be so much reduced that the row of ocelli is placed within the ground-colour. Deviations in the band occur especially often in alpine specimens, though singly also in other places, ab. mendelensis Lowe being based on such variation. From West Europe throughout Central and North Europe, Siberia and North China to Japan, northward to Livonia. North Russia and Amurland. southward to Northern Italy. —
In the east of the area there occur specimens with the eye-rings on the upperside enlarged, ab. achinoides Btl. (= eximia Stgr.). the specimens being moreover often of a brighter colour: but they fly together with individuals which are not distinguishable from European ones. — Larva green, with yellowish brown head.3 dark dorsal hues and pale double lateral stripe ; till May on Lolium, Poa, Triticum, etc. Pupa green, with angular head and a thoracic tubercle. The butterflies occur in woods of tall leaved trees, especially if there is a luxurious undergrowth, in June and July, the flight being dancing. They pitch on bushes, drink on damp places of the roads and imbibe the sap of wounded trees. Widely distributed in Europe, but sporadic and usually not very plentiful, being on the contrary extremely common in East Asia, assembling sometimes in swarms. They even occur in abundance on the islands near the Pacific coast (Yjezo, Askold).
The males appear so much earlier than the males that they usually are already worn when the first females emerge.

The species is widely distributed, but uncommon and local in continental Europe. Most of the suitable habitats for the species have been lost. The woodland brown may be found in warm openings of damp unmanaged mature forests.

References

External links

Lopinga
Butterflies described in 1763
Butterflies of Europe
Taxa named by Giovanni Antonio Scopoli